Mirabilis longiflora, the sweet four o'clock, is a species of flowering plant native to the southwestern United States from Arizona to Texas and northern Mexico. It is night-flowering. The flowers are mostly white, strongly scented, and long and narrow in form, approaching 17 centimeters in maximum length.

References

External links 

longiflora
Night-blooming plants
Taxa named by Carl Linnaeus